Benjamin Gregory Hertzberg (born May 26, 1978), known professionally as Benji Gregory is a former American actor. He is best known for playing the role of Brian Tanner on the sitcom ALF.

Early life
Gregory was born in Los Angeles, California. His father, uncle and sister were all actors; his grandmother was his agent.

Career
In addition to his stint on ALF, he appeared in several television shows which include Fantastic Max (1988-1990), Pound Puppies (1986-1987), Murphy Brown (1988), Fantasy Island (1978), The A-Team (1984), T.J. Hooker (1984), Amazing Stories (1985), The Twilight Zone (1985), and Mr. Boogedy (1986). He also made an appearance in the feature film Jumpin' Jack Flash (1986).

Gregory appeared as himself in the PSAs television series The More You Know, the children's game show series I'm Telling!, the "Salute to the 50 States episodes" of the game show Fun House, as well as on a kids episode of The Dating Game.

Gregory made several appearances on the television sitcom Punky Brewster, playing an orphan named "Dash," and supplied the voice of Edgar the Mole in the animated feature Once Upon a Forest (1993). He was scheduled to co-star in a Punky Brewster spin-off called Fenster Hall. The pilot/television-movie of Fenster Hall was never picked up for regular production.

Work in the Navy
Gregory enlisted in the U.S. Navy in 2003 and graduated school to become an aerographer's mate. In 2005, he received an honorable discharge from the Navy. He married in 2006, after completing his military service.

Filmography

References

External links
 

1978 births
20th-century American male actors
American male child actors
American male television actors
American male voice actors
Male actors from Los Angeles
Living people
Academy of Art University alumni
United States Navy sailors